Puerto Perez or Ch'ililaya (Aymara) is a location in the La Paz Department in Bolivia. It is the seat of the Puerto Pérez Municipality, the fourth municipal section of the Los Andes Province. 

Historically Chililaya or ch'ililaya has been an important via of connection with  La Paz city, in 1879 this location, according with the historian and biographer Nicolas Acosta has been denominated as "La Carretera".

References 

 Instituto Nacional de Estadistica de Bolivia
Acosta Nicolas, Guia del viajero en La Paz (1880), reedición del fondo editorial municipal pensamiento paceño, (2018), concejo municipal de La Paz.

Populated places in La Paz Department (Bolivia)
Populated places on Lake Titicaca
Populated lakeshore places in Bolivia